Petukhovsky District is an administrative and municipal district (raion), one of the twenty-four in Kurgan Oblast, Russia. It is located in the east of the oblast. Its administrative center is the town of Petukhovo. Population:  24,253 (2002 Census);  The population of Petukhovo accounts for 55.1% of the district's total population.

References

Notes

Sources

Districts of Kurgan Oblast